S*H*E* or S+H+E: Security Hazards Expert is a 1980 spy film concerning a sexy undercover female espionage agent. Starring Cornelia Sharpe and Omar Sharif, it was written by Richard Maibaum and is a Martin Bregman production. The main title song was performed by Linda Gaines.

Cast
Cornelia Sharpe - Lavinia Kean aka S*H*E*
Omar Sharif - Baron Cesare Magnasco 
Robert Lansing - Owen Hooper aka Hunt
Anita Ekberg - Dr. Elsa Biebling 
Fabio Testi - Rudolf Caserta 
William Traylor - Lacey 
Isabella Rye - Fanya 
Tom Christopher - Eddie Bronzi
Mario Colli - Mucci
Claudio Ruffini - La Rue
Geoffrey Copleston - U.N. Speaker
Fortunato Arena - Paesano
Gino Marturano - Major Danilo
Emilio Messina - Zec
Rory Maclean
Fritz Hammer

Production
Director Lewis says he did the film "because it was three months in Rome on someone else's money" but that he felt Maibaum's script "was awful and I think I almost had nothing to do with him. My ex wife did the rewrite and off we went.

Lewis says Ekberg was "very difficult" to work with but executive producer Martin Bergman refused to fire her. Lewis decided to fire her anyway but rehired her when she promised to behave which she did. He also said Cornelia Sharpe needed a lot of takes, which caused friction with Omar Sharif who did not.

References

External links

1980 television films
1980 films
Television pilots not picked up as a series
Spy television films
American television films
1980 action thriller films
1980s spy films
American spy films
Films produced by Martin Bregman
Films scored by Michael Kamen
Films with screenplays by Richard Maibaum
West German films
English-language German films
1980s English-language films
Parody films based on James Bond films
Girls with guns films
1980s American films